Hampshire is a station on the Port Authority of Allegheny County's light rail network, located in the Beechview neighborhood of Pittsburgh, Pennsylvania. The T travels along former streetcar tracks on Broadway Avenue through the area. The inbound stop is located on a small island platform in the middle of the road, while the outbound stop is just a sign, with no platform. The station serves a densely populated residential area and also the neighborhood's small but crowded business district. It is located in an area where bus service is limited because of the hilly terrain.

References

External links 

Port Authority T Stations Listings

Port Authority of Allegheny County stations
Railway stations in the United States opened in 1987
Red Line (Pittsburgh)